Keith Walford is the representative for the Saint Ann district in the Parliament of Jamaica. A member of the People's National Party (PNP), he was elected in the 2011 election that saw the PNP win 2/3 of parliamentary seats. He is also the founder of the sound system Bass Odyssey.

References

Living people
Members of the House of Representatives of Jamaica
People from Saint Ann Parish
Year of birth missing (living people)